Klaus Mehnert (October 10, 1906, Moscow, Russia – January 2, 1984, Freudenstadt, Germany) was a German writer, journalist and academic. He was a correspondent in the Soviet Union; a professor in the United States; a publisher of a German-funded journal in China during World War II; and an advisor to several German governments after the war. He was a prolific author.

Early life and education 
Mehnert was born in 1906 in Moscow, Russia. His father was an engineer.

In 1914, at the outbreak of World War I, Mehnert's family left Moscow for Stuttgart, Germany. His father died in Flanders in 1917 as a German soldier. Mehnert attended the University of Tübingen and the University of Munich in Germany, the University of California, Berkeley, in the United States, and finally the University of Berlin, where he received his PhD under Professor Otto Hoetzsch in 1928. Hoetzsch and Mehnert later took part in the short-lived society to study the Soviet command economy, ARPLAN. Mehnert was briefly a supporter of Otto Strasser's Black Front.

Career 
Over the next ten years, Mehnert traveled frequently, to America, the Soviet Union, Japan, and China. He married Enid Keyes († 1955) in California in 1933. From 1934 to 1936 he served as a Soviet correspondent for a German newspaper. In 1936, he was questioned in the press court in Munich under suspicions of being too sympathetic to the Russians; although cleared by the Gestapo, he was forced out of his job. Subsequently, Mehnert moved to the United States, teaching politics at Berkeley and then at the University of Hawaii at Manoa until 1941.

World War II 
In June 1941, six months prior to America's entry to World War II, he left for Shanghai, China, where he published an English-language journal named XXth Century with help from the German foreign ministry and funding from Joseph Goebbels' Nazi Propaganda Ministry. An influential promoter of anti-Allied reports and commentary in Asia, XXth Century was later described by American intelligence as "one of the slickest bits of propaganda work that has been done anywhere". In its four years, Menhert "steered his publication cunningly along a sophisticated path that eschewed overt pro-Axis advocacy", according to the British historian Bernard Wasserstein, with "a wide range of contributors, few of whom were publicly identified with Nazism". The journal was discontinued at the end of the war in 1945, and Mehnert was briefly imprisoned.

Postwar 
Mehnert returned to Germany after the war. In 1946, an American tribunal cleared him of having Nazi affiliations. He continued to face occasional accusations in the American press of spying and anti-Semitism. The German historian Norbert Frei describes Mehnert as "one of the adaptable 'former ones'" in the postwar leadership of the German newspaper Christ und Welt. Mehnert held various positions as journalist, editor, and professor. He became a foreign commentator for South German Radio in 1950. He was a professor of political science at Aachen Institute of Technology. He was the editor of the journal Osteuropa. He was a government advisor on Sino-Russian matters (counseling German chancellors from Konrad Adenauer to Helmut Schmidt). He published several books on political science. In the late 1970s he authored several books on youth movements in Western countries.

He died in 1984 at age 77 in Freudenstadt, West Germany.

Since 2005, the "Europainstitut Klaus Mehnert" has offered a student exchange program between his former university RWTH Aachen and the University of Kaliningrad.

Selected writings 

in German (some translated)
 Ein deutscher Austauschstudent in Kalifornien ("A German exchange student in California"). Stuttgart, 1930
 Die Jugend in Sowjet-Russland. Berlin, 1932; Youth in Soviet Russia. Transl. by Michael Davidson, Westport, Conn., 1981
 The Russians in Hawaii, 1804-19. Hawaii, 1939
 Der Sowjetmensch. Stuttgart, 1958; The Anatomy of Soviet man. Transl. by Maurice Rosenbaum, London, 1961
 Peking und Moskau. Stuttgart, 1962; Peking and Moscow. Transl. by Leila Vennewitz, London, 1963
 China nach dem Sturm. Munich, 1971; China today. Transl. by Cornelia Schaeffer, London, 1972. China Returns. New York, 1972.

in English
 Stalin Versus Marx: The Stalinist Historical Doctrine. London: George Allen and Unwin, 1952. 130 p.
 Soviet Man and His World. New York: Frederick A. Praeger, 1958.
 Peking and Moscow. New York: G. P. Putnam's Sons, 1963. 522 p.
 China Today. London: Thames and Hudson, 1972. 322 p. .
 China Returns. New York: Dutton, 1972. 322 p. .
 Moscow and the New Left. Berkeley & Los Angeles: University of California Press, 1975. 275 p. .
 Twilight of the Young: The Radical Movements of the 1960s and Their Legacy. New York, 1977. 428 p. 
 Youth in Soviet Russia. Hyperion Press, 1981. .
 The Russians & Their Favorite Books. Stanford, CA: Hoover Institution Press, 1983. .

in German
 Peking und Moskau. DTV, 1964. 508 p.
 Der deutsche Standort. Stuttgart: Deutsche Verlags-Anstalt, 1967. 415 p.
 China nach dem Sturm. 1971. Stuttgart: Deutsche Verlags-Anstalt, 340pp, 
 Amerikanische und russische Jugend um 1930. 1973. Stuttgart: Deutsche Verlags-Anstalt, 297pp, 
 Moskau und die neue Linke. 1973. 219pp, 
 Jugend im Zeitbruch: Woher-Wohin. 1976. Stuttgart: Deutsche Verlags-Anstalt, 511pp, 
 Kampf um Maos Erbe: Geschichten machen Geschichte. Stuttgart: Deutsche Verlags-Anstalt, 1977. 319 p. .
 Maos Erben machen's anders. 1979. Stuttgart: Deutsche Verlags-Anstalt, 171pp
 Ein Deutscher in der Welt: Erinnerungen 1906-1981. 1983. Stuttgart: Deutsche Verlags-Anstalt, 447pp, 
 Uber die Russen heute: Was sie lesen, wie sie sind. 1983. Stuttgart: Deutsche Verlags-Anstalt, 352pp, 

in French
 La Rebelión De La Juventud. 1978.

In italian
"Cina rossa". 1972. Milano: Bietti, 372pp.

Notes

External links 
 Articles by Mehnert published in XXth Century
 The Russian Collections of the University of Hawaii, initiated by Mehnert
 Europainstitut Klaus Mehnert (German)

1906 births
1984 deaths
Writers from Stuttgart
People from Moskovsky Uyezd
German male journalists
German male writers
Nazi propagandists
Academic staff of RWTH Aachen University
20th-century German journalists
German expatriates in the Russian Empire
Knights Commander of the Order of Merit of the Federal Republic of Germany
Recipients of the Order of Merit of Baden-Württemberg